Penicillium alexiae is a fungus species of the genus of Penicillium. Penicillium alexiae is named after Princess Alexia of the Netherlands.

See also
List of Penicillium species

References

Further reading
 

alexiae
Fungi described in 2013